Radical 200 or radical hemp meaning "hemp" or "flax" is one of the 6 Kangxi radicals (214 radicals in total) composed of 11 strokes. Historically, it is the Chinese word for cannabis.

In the Kangxi Dictionary, there are 34 characters (out of 49,030) to be found under this radical.

 is also the 193rd indexing component in the Table of Indexing Chinese Character Components predominantly adopted by Simplified Chinese dictionaries published in mainland China.

Evolution

Derived characters

Variant forms

Literature

External links

Unihan Database - U+9EBB

200
193